The Watercress Line operates a wide variety of locomotives and other stock as part of its preserved operations. A comprehensive bank of information about the railway's locomotives and rolling stock can be found on the Watercress Line's website in the "Rolling Stock" section.

Steam locomotives 
The railway plays host to a number of steam locomotives, some of which are owned by the railway (6) whilst the majority are privately owned by individuals. The railway primarily aims to operate locomotives that would have been seen on the railway during its lifetime as a non-preserved railway. All information is from the railways' website.

Operational

Away from the line

Undergoing overhaul or restoration

In storage

Diesel locomotives 

The railway also has a range of Diesel Locomotives and a 2H Diesel Multiple Unit. Although the majority of services on the Watercress Line are steam hauled, diesel locomotives are often found hauling passenger trains in their own right, as well as acting as thunderbird locomotives, trip workings and shunting duties. A diesel gala event is usually held every year as part of a programme of events. All information is from the railways' locos page.

Operational

Undergoing overhaul or Maintenance

Passenger coaches 

The railway currently operates mainly British Railways Mark 1 for its locomotive hauled services.

General service trains normally consist of sets of four or five coaches, with a general maximum of six due to limited platform lengths at most of the line's stations.

Traditional Southern Railway/Region features of fixed sets formations (typified by a brake coach at each end of the rake) and identifying set numbers painted on the brake coaches external bulkhead ends are not followed by the management of the line.

For a period in the 1990s to early 2000s, the railway invested heavily in British Railways Mark 2 stock whilst significantly reducing its Mark 1 fleet. These vehicles were used on the railway's regular services and on mainline steam charters (known at the time as 'The Green Train') but after a change in direction, both with the abandonment of the charter business and the preference to Mark 1 stock, these more modern coaches fell from favour and were later sold en-bloc to another operator. The Mid-Hants then after many years of winding down its Mark 1 fleet started to purchase stock from other operators and began a programme of rebuilding and overhaul for their Mark 1s.

Very few coaches from the old Southern Region found a preservation home on the Mid-Hants with most coming via the Eastern Region and some as far as Scotland arriving on the line still displaying the former owner's ScotRail branding.

The Mid-Hants standardized on BR Southern green for all of its home-based fleet, a contrast to the 1980s, when the whole period of British Railways steam era liveries were in use. Today only one or two coaches stray outside this policy ("Watercress Belle" coaches excepted). In January 2015 4 LBSCR coach bodies for 6 wheel coaches were donated to the Mid Hants Preservation Society. The Mid Hants Railway/Watercress Line does not have any loco that would be small enough to go with the coaches and they would not fit in with other rolling stock, the current plans for the coaches are unknown.

Outside the very numerous Mark 1 home fleet, a number of more vintage Southern vehicles are undergoing restoration or are currently in service.

Pre-nationalisation passenger coaches

British Railways Mark 1 passenger coaches (catering cars)

British Railways Mark 1 passenger coaches

Passenger coaches formerly resident on the Mid Hants Railway (partial list)

Pullman cars

London South Western Railway passenger coaches

Southern Railway passenger coaches

London Midland and Scottish Railway passenger coaches

British Railways Mark 1 passenger coaches

British Railways Mark 1 non corridor passenger coaches

British Railways Mark 2 passenger coaches

Non-passenger coaching stock 
Most of this stock is made up of ex-SECR and ex-SR PMVYs. Most of these are used as stores vans although one is used to house a model railway.

Goods Stock 
This section is currently being worked on and may not contain all goods stock currently or their current status on the Watercress Line. Most of their operational goods stock are fitted through vacuum pipes.

The Watercress Line owns many BR wagons along with a few SR Pillbox Brake Vans, two LMS vans, a Great Western three-axle tanker, a recently built cattle wagon, an LNER open wagon, etc.

Brake vans

Open wagons

Conflats and other low

Covered goods vans

Tanks

Other wagons

Cranes

References

External links
 Mid Hants Railway official website

Watercress Line
Lists of locomotives and rolling stock preserved on heritage railways in England